Practical joke is a mischievous trick played on someone.

Practical Joke may also refer to:

 Practical Joke (1977 film), a romantic drama
 Practical Joke (2008 film), a Russian romantic drama
 Practical Joke (horse), an American Thoroughbred racehorse
 Practical Jokers, a 1938 Our Gang short comedy film

See also
 Practical joker (disambiguation)